The 2015 Kontinental Hockey League All-Star Game was the All-Star game for the 2014–15 season of the Kontinental Hockey League (KHL). It took place on 25 January 2015 at the Bolshoy Ice Dome in Sochi, Russia, and resulted in Team East, captained by Danis Zaripov, winning 18–16 over Team West, captained by Ilya Kovalchuk.

See also
2014–15 KHL season
Kontinental Hockey League All-Star Game

References

External links
 Official homepage

KHL All-Star Game
2015
All Star Game
21st century in Sochi
January 2015 sports events in Russia